Win McCormack is an American publisher and editor from Oregon.

He is editor-in-chief of Tin House magazine and Tin House Books, the former publisher of Oregon Magazine, founder and treasurer of MediAmerica, Inc., and a co-founder of Mother Jones magazine. He serves on the board of directors of the journal New Perspectives Quarterly. His political and social writings have appeared in Oregon Humanities, Tin House, The Nation, The Oregonian, and Oregon Magazine.  McCormack's investigative coverage of the Rajneeshee movement was awarded a William Allen White Commendation from the University of Kansas and the City and Regional Magazine Association.

As a political activist, McCormack served as Chair of the Oregon Steering Committee for Gary Hart's 1984 presidential campaign. He was chair of the Democratic Party of Oregon's President's Council and a member of the Obama for President Oregon Finance Committee. Additionally, McCormack sits on the Board of Overseers for Emerson College, and is a co-founder of the Los Angeles–based Liberty Hill Foundation.

In February 2016, McCormack purchased The New Republic magazine from Chris Hughes.

He received an A.B. from Harvard College and an MFA from the University of Oregon.

Books 
 2008 You Don't Know Me: A Citizen's Guide to Republican Family Values. Portland, Oregon: Tin House Books. .
 2010 The Rajneesh Chronicles. Portland, Oregon: Tin House Books. .

References

External links
Official website

American male non-fiction writers
American political writers
Harvard College alumni
Living people
University of Oregon alumni
Writers from Oregon
Year of birth missing (living people)